The Team free routine competition at the 2017 World Championships was held on 19 and 21 July 2017.

Results
The preliminary round was started on 19 July at 19:00. The final was held on 21 July at 11:00.

Green denotes finalists

References

Team free routine